Moscow City Duma District 11 is one of 45 constituencies in Moscow City Duma. The constituency has covered parts of North-Eastern Moscow from 1993-2005 and since 2014. From 2005-2009 District 11 was based in South-Western and Southern Moscow (it actually overlapped the entirety of State Duma Chertanovo constituency), while from 2009-2014 — in Southern Moscow.

Members elected

Election results

2001

|-
! colspan=2 style="background-color:#E9E9E9;text-align:left;vertical-align:top;" |Candidate
! style="background-color:#E9E9E9;text-align:left;vertical-align:top;" |Party
! style="background-color:#E9E9E9;text-align:right;" |Votes
! style="background-color:#E9E9E9;text-align:right;" |%
|-
|style="background-color:"|
|align=left|Aleksandr Krutov (incumbent)
|align=left|Independent
|
|37.52%
|-
|style="background-color:"|
|align=left|Andrey Babushkin
|align=left|Yabloko
|
|26.87%
|-
|style="background-color:"|
|align=left|Nikolay Zubrilin
|align=left|Independent
|
|16.87%
|-
|style="background-color:#000000"|
|colspan=2 |against all
|
|15.12%
|-
| colspan="5" style="background-color:#E9E9E9;"|
|- style="font-weight:bold"
| colspan="3" style="text-align:left;" | Total
| 
| 100%
|-
| colspan="5" style="background-color:#E9E9E9;"|
|- style="font-weight:bold"
| colspan="4" |Source:
|
|}

2005

|-
! colspan=2 style="background-color:#E9E9E9;text-align:left;vertical-align:top;" |Candidate
! style="background-color:#E9E9E9;text-align:left;vertical-align:top;" |Party
! style="background-color:#E9E9E9;text-align:right;" |Votes
! style="background-color:#E9E9E9;text-align:right;" |%
|-
|style="background-color:"|
|align=left|Oleg Bocharov (incumbent)
|align=left|United Russia
|
|61.65%
|-
|style="background-color:"|
|align=left|Yevgeny Volkov
|align=left|Communist Party
|
|16.52%
|-
|style="background-color:"|
|align=left|Sergey Kuranov
|align=left|Independent
|
|8.39%
|-
|style="background-color:"|
|align=left|Anzhelika Goryunova
|align=left|Liberal Democratic Party
|
|7.49%
|-
| colspan="5" style="background-color:#E9E9E9;"|
|- style="font-weight:bold"
| colspan="3" style="text-align:left;" | Total
| 
| 100%
|-
| colspan="5" style="background-color:#E9E9E9;"|
|- style="font-weight:bold"
| colspan="4" |Source:
|
|}

2009

|-
! colspan=2 style="background-color:#E9E9E9;text-align:left;vertical-align:top;" |Candidate
! style="background-color:#E9E9E9;text-align:left;vertical-align:top;" |Party
! style="background-color:#E9E9E9;text-align:right;" |Votes
! style="background-color:#E9E9E9;text-align:right;" |%
|-
|style="background-color:"|
|align=left|Stepan Orlov (incumbent)
|align=left|United Russia
|
|74.46%
|-
|style="background-color:"|
|align=left|Sergey Timokhov
|align=left|Communist Party
|
|9.28%
|-
|style="background-color:"|
|align=left|Larisa Gorchakova
|align=left|A Just Russia
|
|6.58%
|-
|style="background-color:"|
|align=left|Maksim Pershin
|align=left|Liberal Democratic Party
|
|3.92%
|-
|style="background-color:"|
|align=left|Yevgeny Ageyev
|align=left|Independent
|
|3.04%
|-
| colspan="5" style="background-color:#E9E9E9;"|
|- style="font-weight:bold"
| colspan="3" style="text-align:left;" | Total
| 
| 100%
|-
| colspan="5" style="background-color:#E9E9E9;"|
|- style="font-weight:bold"
| colspan="4" |Source:
|
|}

2014

|-
! colspan=2 style="background-color:#E9E9E9;text-align:left;vertical-align:top;" |Candidate
! style="background-color:#E9E9E9;text-align:left;vertical-align:top;" |Party
! style="background-color:#E9E9E9;text-align:right;" |Votes
! style="background-color:#E9E9E9;text-align:right;" |%
|-
|style="background-color:"|
|align=left|Nikolay Zubrilin
|align=left|Communist Party
|
|32.41%
|-
|style="background-color:"|
|align=left|Andrey Babushkin
|align=left|Yabloko
|
|27.95%
|-
|style="background-color:"|
|align=left|Igor Siliverstov
|align=left|A Just Russia
|
|20.95%
|-
|style="background-color:"|
|align=left|Vadim Savateyev
|align=left|Liberal Democratic Party
|
|14.67%
|-
| colspan="5" style="background-color:#E9E9E9;"|
|- style="font-weight:bold"
| colspan="3" style="text-align:left;" | Total
| 
| 100%
|-
| colspan="5" style="background-color:#E9E9E9;"|
|- style="font-weight:bold"
| colspan="4" |Source:
|
|}

2019

|-
! colspan=2 style="background-color:#E9E9E9;text-align:left;vertical-align:top;" |Candidate
! style="background-color:#E9E9E9;text-align:left;vertical-align:top;" |Party
! style="background-color:#E9E9E9;text-align:right;" |Votes
! style="background-color:#E9E9E9;text-align:right;" |%
|-
|style="background-color:"|
|align=left|Nikolay Zubrilin (incumbent)
|align=left|Communist Party
|
|43.12%
|-
|style="background-color:"|
|align=left|Yevgeny Nifantyev
|align=left|Independent
|
|33.26%
|-
|style="background-color:"|
|align=left|Yevgeny Rybin
|align=left|Liberal Democratic Party
|
|12.55%
|-
|style="background-color:"|
|align=left|Aleksandr Luchin
|align=left|A Just Russia
|
|7.42%
|-
| colspan="5" style="background-color:#E9E9E9;"|
|- style="font-weight:bold"
| colspan="3" style="text-align:left;" | Total
| 
| 100%
|-
| colspan="5" style="background-color:#E9E9E9;"|
|- style="font-weight:bold"
| colspan="4" |Source:
|
|}

Notes

References

Moscow City Duma districts